Close to the Bone is the eighth instalment in the bestselling Detective Sergeant McRae series of crime novels from Stuart MacBride.

Plot

Logan McRae is still living in a caravan, his girlfriend, Samantha, is still unresponsive and someone is leaving bones on his doorstep. Besides all this he has to cope with Detective Inspector Steel, a string of assaults and someone who is going around and Necklacing people. More murders follow and the filming of a novel about witchcraft seems to be inspiring the Necklacing murders. This leads to a confrontation with McRae's erstwhile boss, David Insch, ex DI from Grampian Police, who is now on the production team for the film.

References

2013 British novels
Novels set in Scotland
Novels by Stuart MacBride
Orion Books books